Veryal Eisha Aqila Zulfikar Basyaiban or better known as Veve Zulfikar (born 7 July 2003) is an Indonesian religious singer, actress, and brand ambassador. In addition, she is also an Indonesian young qāriʾah (female reciter of the Quran) who is often invited to various provinces in Indonesia to recite verses of the Quran at various religious events. Since 8 October 2016, Veve Zulfikar joined YouTube and began uploading content as she recited the verses of the Quran, sang the salawat and qasida, also shared her daily activities (video blog). On 26 July 2017, Veve released her first single, entitled Sepercik Do'a Cinta, which was created by her father, Zulfikar Mohammad Basyaiban.

Early life
Veve Zulfikar was born Veryal Eisha Aqila as the eldest child of five siblings from a married couple, Zulfikar Mohammad Basyaiban (or also known as Mohammad Miqdar Zulfikar or Zyal Fikar during his debut at Musabaqah Tilawatil Quran) and Riza Fitriya Zahro. Her three younger siblings included Zahwa Heyralva Zahra (Zara Zulfikar Basyaiban), Mohammad Haidar Ashraaf (Haidar Zulfikar Basyaiban), Avro Humaira (Maira Zulfikar Basyaiban), and Helwa Zulfikar Basyaiban. Her father was an international qāriʾ from Sidoarjo Regency, East Java, who founded the House of Tilawah Al-Qur'an since 2013, an educational institution for Islamic boarding schools that focuses on the study of the Quranic qira'at. Her grandfather, Habib Muhammad Rozi Syihab Basyaiban, is the founder and leader of the Pondok Pesantren Sabilun Najah Watukosek, an Islamic boarding school that teaches the Quranic science in Pasuruan Regency.

Discography

Singles
 Sepercik Do'a Cinta (2017)
 Berakhir Indah (2018)
 Sholawat Burdah (2018)
 Sholawat Nahdliyah (2018)

Filmography

Film

References

Works cited

External links
 Veve Zulfikar official website
 
 

2003 births
Living people
Indonesian people of Yemeni descent
Indonesian actresses
People from Jombang Regency
Indonesian Muslims
Indonesian Quran reciters
21st-century Indonesian women singers
Indonesian YouTubers